Tivadar Uray (9 November 1895 – 22 June 1962) was a Hungarian film actor. He appeared in more than 40 films between 1917 and 1962. He was born and died in Munkács, Hungary (now Mukachevo, Ukraine).

Selected filmography
 A Vörös Sámson (1917)
 A Kuruzsló (1917)
 Mary Ann (1918)
 Neither at Home or Abroad (1918)
 Különös házasság (1951)
 Two Confessions (1957)

External links

1895 births
1962 deaths
Hungarian male film actors
Hungarian male silent film actors
20th-century Hungarian male actors